Dembo Konte (or Konté) (died January 2014) & Kausu Kuyateh (died 16 June 2018) were master kora players from West Africa. They were also singers and, above all, jalis; storytellers and guardians of oral tradition, preserving the history of people and events via their music. Stories and history are passed down from generation to generation by this method within families and groups of friends, ensuring survival of such stories for centuries. The jali sings the praises of his friends and benefactors, warns the politicians of their errors and admonishes the listeners to live right. Their music encapsulates the Mandinka culture.

Konte and Kuyateh have taken the kora to a new level, having modified their instruments to expand the kora's range by adding extra bass strings to the classic 21 -string harp-like instrument. Roots World described the interplay of the two musicians as "fascinating, as they twist and turn around the melody, fighting against each other and then suddenly forming a unison that shimmers up and down a scale before parting ways again."  Their repertoire includes Mamma Manneh, a rolling dance tune from the Wolof tradition and Saliya, one of the oldest songs written for the kora.

Since 1987, they have toured worldwide and their albums have been acclaimed as the most accessible from this tradition. In 1998 journalist and World Music proponent Charlie Gillett stated "Nothing is ever quite the same after the first time you hear a kora played live in a West African setting. Dembo Konte was the musician who opened my ears, and he made these recordings with Kausu Kuyateh soon afterwards. They still sound powerful and raw, evocative and timeless."

Usually performing as a duo, Konte (from The Gambia) and Kuyateh (from Senegal) have also collaborated with British musicians to create a fusion of West African and western musical styles, retaining the kora and their voices as the primary centres of attention. In 1989 they toured the UK and, on 5 September recorded a session for the John Peel show on BBC radio. They also collaborated that year with Hijaz, Houzam, and Sabah Habas from 3 Mustaphas 3. The main feature of the resultant album (Jali Roll) is the duo's vocals and kora, but once John Kirkpatrick's button accordion comes in, it creates a mood which belongs to neither Europe nor Africa. Track 3 is an old song from Mali, but transformed by boogie-type arrangement. This album was chosen by British music magazines Q and Vox for World Music Album of the Year. When re-issued in 2001, a live track from their London show in 1989 was added.

On the album Jaliology the duo is joined by Mawdo Suso playing balafon, a traditional rosewood instrument resembling a xylophone.

Konte lives in Brikama, in an area of The Gambia noted for its musical traditions and is the son of Alhaji Bai Konte, also a noted kora player and singer in his own right. He has also played and recorded with Malamini Jobarteh.

Similarly, Kuyateh comes from a family of jali musicians and the tradition continues as a younger generation of the Konte and Kuyateh families take the music and stories to a wider audience through international performances and CDs

Discography

Dembo Konte and Kausu Kuyateh
Kairaba Jabi compilation (CD)
Weekend Beatnik WEBE 9032 (1987)

Tracks:
 Kairaba Jabi
 Simbomba 	
 Ngaleng Sonko
 Saliya 	
 Mamma Maneh 	
 Mammadu Sanyang
 Demba Hajada 	
 Banta Toure 	
 Yeyengo 	
 Tiramakhan
 Fayinkunko 	
 Sunkariba
 Solo

Simbomba (12" vinyl album)
UK: Rogue Records FMLS2011 (1987)
USA: Red House Records RHR27 (1990)

Tracks:
 Simbomba
 Ngaleng Sonko
 Saliya
 Mamma Manneh
 Mammadu Sanyang
 Demba Hejada
 Banta Toure

Jali Roll (CD)
Weekend Beatnik WEBE 9038 (1990)

Tracks:
 Alla L'aa Ke
 President Diawara
 Lambango
 Sana Diop
 Madiba Jabi
 Amadou Faal
 Sarah 1
 Sarah 2
 Ami N'Diaye
 Mariama Diallo
 British

Jaliology with Mawdo Suso (CD)
Xenophile Records  (1995)

Tracks:

 Serifu Sidi Haidara
 Yussufa Nyabali
 Alhaji Sidia Diabi Tasilimang 	
 Dudu Touray 	
 Tunko Darbo 	
 Alisewo
 Adama Ning Nahawa
 Ke Koto Mani 	
Lambango

Jali Roll (Revisited +1)  (CD)
Weekend Beatnik WEBE 9038 (2001)

Tracks:
as "Jali Roll", with addition of:
 Sana Diop (Live Bonus Track)

Dembo Konté and Malamini Jobarteh
Baa Toto (CD)
Wallbank Warwick Communications Ltd WWCD005 (1984)

Tracks:
 Jato
 Alla l'Aa Keh
 Baatoto
 Cheddo
 Kumbasora
 Ten Kulu Kumba Wecho
 Amadu Faal
 Fodé Kaba

References

Gambian singers
21st-century Senegalese male singers
Gambian Kora players
20th-century Senegalese male singers